Nils Landgren (August 19, 1923 – November 15, 2002) was a Swedish bobsledder who competed in the 1950s. He won a bronze medal in the four-man event (tied with West Germany) at the 1953 FIBT World Championships in Garmisch-Partenkirchen.

Landgren also finished sixth in the four-man event and 15th in the two-man event at the 1952 Winter Olympics in Oslo.

References
1952 bobsleigh two-man results
Bobsleigh four-man world championship medalists since 1930
Wallenchinsky, David. (1984). "Bobsled: Four-man". In The Complete Book of the Olympics: 1896-1980. New York: Penguin Books. p. 561.

1923 births
2002 deaths
Swedish male bobsledders
Olympic bobsledders of Sweden
Bobsledders at the 1952 Winter Olympics